Volotskoy is a rural locality (a passing loop) in Pertsevskoye Rural Settlement, Gryazovetsky District, Vologda Oblast, Russia. The population was 5 as of 2002.

Geography 
Volotskoy is located 16 km north of Gryazovets (the district's administrative centre) by road. Voronino is the nearest rural locality.

References 

Rural localities in Gryazovetsky District